Leptinus orientamericanus is a species of round fungus beetle in the Leiodidae family. It is found in North America.

References

 Majka C, Langor D (2008). "The Leiodidae (Coleoptera) of Atlantic Canada: new records, faunal composition, and zoogeography". ZooKeys 2: 357–402.
 Peck, Stewart B. (1982). "A review of the ectoparasitic Leptinus beetles of North America (Coleoptera: Leptinidae)". Canadian Journal of Zoology, vol. 60, no. 7, 1517–1527.

Leiodidae
Beetles described in 1982